First Reformed Dutch Church, Hackensack
First Reformed Dutch Church of Bergen Neck
First Reformed Church, New Brunswick, New Jersey